Joann Willette (born October 12, 1963) is an American actress.

Willette is best known for appearing in the role of Constance "Connie" Lubbock in the television series Just the Ten of Us from 1988 to 1990. She has also made appearances on a number of other series including The Facts of Life, T. J. Hooker, Santa Barbara, Growing Pains, Melrose Place, Chicago Hope, Becker, ER, The Young and the Restless, My Sister Sam, Private Practice, The New Adventures of Old Christine, and in movies such as A Nightmare on Elm Street 2: Freddy's Revenge and  Welcome to 18. She also was in a music video in 1986 titled "Your Love" by The Outfield.

On June 4, 2014, Willette appeared on Ken Reid's TV Guidance Counselor Podcast.

Award nominations

References

External links

 

1963 births
Actresses from Maine
American film actresses
American television actresses
Living people
People from Lewiston, Maine
21st-century American women